John Hume  (1743–1818) was a Dean of the Church of Ireland.

He was born in Oxford; educated at Westminster School and Trinity College, Cambridge; and ordained in 1769. He held livings at Gillingham, Dorset and West Lavington, Wiltshire. He was Dean of Derry from 1783 until his death.

References

1743 births
1818 deaths
People educated at Westminster School, London
Alumni of Christ Church, Oxford
18th-century Irish Anglican priests
Deans of Derry
People from Oxford